Pārgauja Municipality is a former municipality in Vidzeme, Latvia. The municipality was formed in 2009 by merging Raiskums Parish, Stalbe Parish and Straupe Parish, the administrative centre being Stalbe. As of 2020, the population was 3,576.

On 1 July 2021, Pārgauja Municipality ceased to exist and its territory was merged into Cēsis Municipality.

Twin towns — sister cities

Pārgauja is twinned with:
 Motta Santa Lucia, Italy
 Oarja, Romania
 Rîșcani, Moldova
 Spydeberg, Norway

See also
Administrative divisions of Latvia

References

 
Former municipalities of Latvia